Gerania (subtitled: Gerania; a New Discovery of a Little Sort of People, anciently discoursed of, called Pygmies) is a 1675 book by Joshua Barnes. The work falls into the utopian socialism genre. It is set in India, with a race of pygmies living within a communitarian utopia, with Homer as their "lawgiver". In contrast with the policy of closure and occlusion common to the movement, Barnes' pygmy utopia is open and congenial, affable to outsiders.

References

1675 books